Xinyi Township or Sinyi Township is a mountain indigenous township in Nantou County, Taiwan. It is the largest township by area of Nantou County. Xinyi is home to the Bunun people of the Taiwanese aborigines.

Geography

Administrative divisions

The township comprises 14 villages: 
1 Tannan　　
2 Deli
3 Shuanglong　　
4 Tungpu　　　　　　　
5 Tongfu　　  
6 Shenmu
7 Wangmei　　   
8 Luona　　　　　　
9 Xinxiang　　
10 Zijiang　　　
11 Aiguo　　
12 Mingde
13 Renhe　　
14 Fengqiu

Economy
The township ranks first in Taiwan in terms of plum production, reaching an annual production of 20,000 tonnes.

Infrastructures
 Lulin Observatory

Tourist attractions

 Batongguan Trail
 Mount Dongjun
 Mount Mabolasi
 Mount Zhuoshe
 Shuiyuan Suspension Bridge
 Yushan National Park
 Fengguidou
 Dongpu Hot Springs
 Pinglai Scenic Area
 Rainbow Falls, Lover's Valley
 Cloud Dragon Falls, Double Dragon Falls
 Fubuzhizi Precipice
 Danda Mountain Trail, Danye Mountain Trail
 Seven Colors Lake
 Papaya Pit Falls
 Shenmu Giant Camphor Tree
 Husband and Wife Trees

Transportation
 Provincial Highway No. 16
 Provincial Highway No. 18
 Provincial Highway No. 21

References

External links

 Sinyi Township Office, Nantou County

Townships in Nantou County